V381 Cephei (HR 8164) is a triple star system in the northern constellation of Cepheus.  Its apparent magnitude is slightly variable between 5.5 and 5.7.

System
V381 Cephei is a visual double star with components A and B separated by 4.6".  The primary is HD 203338 and the secondary is the magnitude 9.2 HD 203339.

HD 203338 is itself a spectroscopic binary with components Aa and Ab orbiting every 280 years.  It forms a VV Cephei-type binary system with a hot companion which is accreting mass from the primary.  The long period means that it exhibits fewer peculiarities than other VV Cephei binaries.

Properties

Component Aa is a red supergiant and its close companion is a B2 main sequence star.  The supergiant is a pulsating variable with a small amplitude and poorly defined period.  It is generally given spectral class qualifiers indicating peculiarities and emission, which may be associated with the disc around the hot secondary.

References

Cepheus (constellation)
Cephei, V381
203338 9
8164
M-type supergiants
105259
B-type main-sequence stars
BD+58 2249
J21191567+5837246
Slow irregular variables
Emission-line stars
Triple star systems